Burnout: Championship Drag Racing, also known as simply Burnout, is a video game developed by MediaTech West and published by Bethesda Softworks for MS-DOS, released on March 20, 1998. A Player's Choice Edition was released in September 1998 for both DOS and Microsoft Windows. Burnout was licensed by the Hot Rod magazine. Although the name suggests otherwise, the game is not a part of the Burnout series, which would begin 3 years later in 2001.

Development
The game was developed by Washington based MediaTech West, the same team that did XCar: Experimental Racing in conjunction with Hot Rod Magazine. The game utilizes Bethesda's XnGine It was originally scheduled  to be released in November 1997. The game went gold on March 13, 1998

Reception

The game received average reviews according to the review aggregation website GameRankings. GameSpot said, "Burnout has such a refreshing feel and intense bursts of white-knuckled action that it's really worth sticking it out for a while." Next Generation said, "The single race is nice for a quick, visceral moment, but the real game is competing in a season or going head-to-head with someone over a network – by far the most adrenaline-pumping way to play."

According to Pete Hines, Director of Marketing and Public Relations at Bethesda, the game is the best-selling drag racing game of all time.

References

External links
 
 

1998 video games
Bethesda Softworks games
DOS games
North America-exclusive video games
Racing video games
Video games based on literature
Video games developed in the United States
Windows games
XnGine games